Emergency Medical Technician is the entry level of Emergency Medical Technician (pre-hospital emergency medical provider) in the United States.

EMTs are not trained to provide definitive medical care, but instead focus on rapid in-field treatment and transport to higher medical providers. EMTs work in conjunction with other medical providers such as paramedics, nurses, and physicians, as well as with other EMTs. When operating in the prehospital environment, their actions are governed by protocols and procedures set by their system's physician medical director.

Education and training
EMT training is regulated at both the state and federal level. At the federal level, the National Highway Traffic Safety Administration (NHTSA) has developed a minimum content and hour curriculum, but it is not binding on the states. This is known as the National Standard Curriculum. Under the NHTSA curriculum, students receive 110 hours of lecture and lab time covering anatomy, physiology, legal aspects of medical care, assessment, and treatment of medical, trauma, behavioral, and obstetric emergencies. In addition to class time, the NHTSA recommends clinical rotations on board ambulances and in emergency departments.

Using NHTSA guidelines, the National Registry of Emergency Medical Technicians have developed and implemented certification tests for the NHTSA EMT levels, including the EMT level. As of 2006, 39 US states utilize the NREMT EMT exam as part of the state licensing and/or certification procedure.

Once certified, EMTs are required to obtain continuing education hours to recertify. Recertification requirements vary from state to state. Continuing education courses can cover a variety of topics, provided that they cover relevant material, including college courses covering anatomy, physiology, or psychology, to more applied courses that are either standardized, such as a Prehospital Trauma Life Support (PHTLS), or tailored to the needs of an individual EMS system or region.

Some states  allow for an already certified EMT from another state to apply for reciprocity in their state. The states that participate in this can be found by contacting the certification boards of each state or on their websites.

Scope of practice

The scope of medical practice for EMTs is regulated by state law, and can vary significantly both among states as well as inside states. In general, EMTs provide what is considered basic life support (BLS) and are limited to essentially non-invasive procedures. Besides employing basic medical assessment skills, typical procedures provided by EMTs include CPR, automated external defibrillation, mechanical ventilation using a bag valve mask, placement of air way adjuncts such as oropharyngeal and nasopharyngeal airways, pulse oximetry, glucose testing using a glucometer, splinting (including spinal immobilization and traction splints), and suctioning. In addition, EMT-Bs are trained to assist patients with administration of certain prescribed medications, including nitroglycerin, metered-dose inhaler such as albuterol, and epinephrine auto injectors such as the EpiPen. EMT-Bs can typically also administer certain non-preprescribed drugs including oxygen, oral glucose, and activated charcoal (usually upon medical direction). In response to the opioid overdose epidemic, states are rapidly changing protocols to permit EMT-Bs to administer naloxone as well. 

Individually, each state is free to add or subtract to their EMTs scope of practice. For example, EMTs working in California may not administer activated charcoal, an NHTSA approved intervention, under a standard certification. Local EMS systems (i.e. counties in California) can apply to the state to implement an extended scope of practice for EMTs that includes activated charcoal as well as other pharmaceutical interventions not normally allowed to be administered by EMTs.

See also 
 Emergency medical responder levels by state
 National Association of Emergency Medical Technicians
 Emergency Medical Services in the United States
 Medic
 Combat medic
 Rescue squad
 Wilderness emergency medical technician

References

External links
 National Highway Traffic Safety Agency, Office of Emergency Medical Services
 The Difference Between an EMT and a Paramedic
 The Basics about Emergency Medical Technician 

Emergency medical responders
Emergency medical services in the United States
Medical credentials

da:Ambulanceassistent
de:Rettungssanitäter
fr:Secours paramédicaux
he:חובש
ja:救急救命士